Chris Georgiades is a Cypriot businessman. From 14 January 2009 he is the president of Anorthosis Famagusta F.C., a Cypriot football club from the town of Famagusta. He was also general secretary of the Cyprus Football Association.

References
Πρόεδρος της Ανόρθωσης ο Chris Parlas

Anorthosis Famagusta F.C.
Year of birth missing (living people)
Living people
Cypriot businesspeople
Place of birth missing (living people)